Richmond Alexander Lattimore (May 6, 1906 – February 26, 1984) was an American poet and classicist known for his translations of the Greek classics, especially his versions of the Iliad and Odyssey.

Early life and career
Born to David and Margaret Barnes Lattimore in Paotingfu, China, he graduated from Dartmouth College in 1926. His brother Owen Lattimore was a Sinologist who was blacklisted for his association with China during the McCarthy era, but subsequently rehabilitated when none of the charges against him proved to be true. Their sister Eleanor Frances Lattimore was an author and illustrator of children's books.

Richmond was a Rhodes Scholar at Christ Church, Oxford, and received his B.A. in 1932, and subsequently, under the direction of William Abbott Oldfather, received a Ph.D. from the University of Illinois in 1934. He joined the Department of Greek at Bryn Mawr College the following year, and married Alice Bockstahler, with whom he later had two sons, Steven and Alexander;  Steven also became a classical scholar and professor at UCLA.

From 1943 to 1946, Lattimore was absent from his professorial post to serve in the United States Navy, but returned after the war to remain at Bryn Mawr College, with periodic visiting positions at other universities, until his retirement in 1971. He continued to publish poems and translations for the remainder of his life, with two poems appearing in print posthumously.

From 1953 to 1960, he partnered with David Grene to co-edit a complete translation of the Greek tragedies of Aeschylus, Sophocles, and Euripides for University of Chicago Press.

He translated the Book of Revelation in 1962. A 1979 edition by McGraw-Hill Ryerson included the four Gospels.  Lattimore completed his translation of the entire New Testament, which was published posthumously in 1996 with the title The New Testament.

For many years Lattimore accompanied his wife Alice to services at the Episcopal Church of the Good Shepherd, Rosemont, near Bryn Mawr College, a church with an Anglo-Catholic worship tradition. . He chose to be baptized on Easter Eve 1983 and confirmed as a communicant there, due in part to his work translating the Gospel of St. Luke.

Memberships
Lattimore was a Fellow of the Academy of American Poets, and a member of Phi Beta Kappa, the National Institute of Arts and Letters, the American Academy of Arts and Sciences, the American Philosophical Society, the American Philological Association, and the Archaeological Institute of America, as well as a Fellow of the American Academy at Rome and an Honorary Student at Christ Church, Oxford.

Books

Translations 
The Odes of Pindar. Chicago: University of Chicago Press, 1947.
Greek Lyrics. Chicago: University of Chicago Press, 1949. Revised 1960.
The Iliad of Homer. Chicago: University of Chicago Press, 1951.
The Works and Days; Theogony; The Shield of Herakles. Ann Arbor: University of Michigan Press, 1959.
The Frogs. Ann Arbor: University of Michigan Press, 1962.
The Odyssey of Homer. New York: Harper & Row, 1967. 
The Four Gospels and the Revelation, Newly Translated from the Greek. New York: Farrar Straus Giroux, 1979.
Acts and Letters of the Apostles, Newly Translated from the Greek. New York: Farrar Straus Giroux, 1982.
The New Testament. New York: Farrar Straus Giroux, 1996.

Poetry 
 The Stride of Time. Ann Arbor: University of Michigan Press, 1966.
 Poems from Three Decades. New York: Charles Scribner's Sons, 1972.

Awards
Lattimore's translation of Aristophanes' The Frogs won the Bollingen Poetry Translation Prize in 1962.

See also
English translations of Homer#LattimoreIl

References and sources
References

Sources

External links
 
 Richmond Lattimore a brief bio from the Poetry Foundation with online poems

1906 births
1984 deaths
Greek–English translators
Dartmouth College alumni
Translators of the Bible into English
20th-century American poets
20th-century translators
University of Illinois Urbana-Champaign alumni
Alumni of Christ Church, Oxford
Bryn Mawr College faculty
Translators of Homer